Herbert George Columbine VC (28 November 1893 – 22 March 1918) was an English recipient of the Victoria Cross, the highest and most prestigious award for gallantry in the face of the enemy that can be awarded to British and Commonwealth forces.

Columbine was 24 years old, and a private in the 9th Squadron, Machine Gun Corps, British Army during the First World War when the action for which he was awarded the VC took place.

On 22 March 1918 at Hervilly Wood, France, Private Columbine took over command of a Vickers gun and kept firing it from 9 a.m. to 1 p.m. in an isolated position with no wire in front. During this time wave after wave of the enemy failed to get up to him, but at last with the help of a low-flying aircraft the enemy managed to gain a strong foothold in the trench. As the position was now untenable, Private Columbine told the two remaining men to get away, and although he was being bombed on either side, he kept his gun firing, inflicting losses, until he was killed by a bomb which blew him up along with his gun.

Commemoration
Columbine is named on the Pozières Memorial, in the Somme department of France, to the missing of the Fifth Army.

The Columbine Centre, a leisure and community centre in Walton-on-the-Naze, is named after him.

The Columbine Statue Fund was set up under the patronage of Dame Judi Dench to raise money for a statue to Columbine in Walton on the Naze. The statue, sculpted by John Doubleday, was erected on 1 August 2014 on the seafront at Walton on the Naze.

References

 Details
Monuments to Courage (David Harvey, 1999)
The Register of the Victoria Cross (This England, 1997)
VCs of the First World War: Spring Offensive 1918 (Gerald Gliddon, 1997)

1893 births
1918 deaths
Machine Gun Corps soldiers
British World War I recipients of the Victoria Cross
British military personnel killed in World War I
British Army personnel of World War I
People from Penge
19th Royal Hussars soldiers
Military personnel from London
British Army recipients of the Victoria Cross
People from Walton-on-the-Naze
Deaths by hand grenade